Yadavally (also spelled Madha Yadavally, M Yadavally, Yadavally or Yadavalli) is a village located in the Nalgonda district of Telangana, India. It is connected to Hyderabad by National Highway 9 and Nalgonda by the SH 2 State Highway.

The village is currently receiving a lot of attention due to the economic development that has taken place over the past few years. This growth has largely been due to the village's strategic location and rapid industrialization. It lies between the two largest cities in the state, Hyderabad and Vijayawada. Yadavally has a solar power project and one of the best private medical colleges in A.P. (Kamineni Institute of Medical Sciences which offers courses including MBBS, Dental, Nursing and PG). The KIMS Hospital, which is attached to the medical colleges, serves the people of Narketpally and the surrounding villages including Yadavally. It also has strong industrial infrastructure. Several factories, such as OCTL, Heritage milk factory, and USTL are located in Yadavally. The Nalgonda district is home to Mahatma Gandhi University and a police academy is located just 7 km away from the village.

Dr. A.S. Narayana sir and Mother Teresa foundations are helping the village develop.

The village youth established a society called Our Village & Our Development, which provides awareness on education and village development.

Yadavally is located approximately 70 km from Hyderabad (the state capital of Telangana), which is ranked amongst the world's top 10 fastest growing cities by the World Economic Forum.

Near to the village there is an APSRTC Narketpally, bus depot and bus stand.

Yadavally is a Gram panchayat and 3 small villages come under this Gram panchayat.

They are:

 Naibai (Reddys colony) 
 Pothineni Pally 
 Surya Nagar

It has 1 sarpanch and 10 ward members.

Sarpanch – Bokka Bhupal reddy

Yadavally village comes under Assembly constituency nakerkal (MLA- chrimurthy lingaiha )and Parliament constituency Bhuvanagiri (MP – kvr).

Temples

 The Hanuman temple, located in the middle of the village
 The Muthyala temple in Naibai, considered beautiful
 The Ganga Devamma temple
 Hanuman temple in Naibai

Yadavally has a large pond of approximately 100 acres, and is well known for agriculture, primarily goats and sheep. A big mountain is located in the Naibai village.

References

Villages in Nalgonda district